Wulfthryth may refer to

Wulfthryth of Wessex (fl. 868), queen consort of Wessex
Wulfthryth of Wilton (10th century), mother of Saint Edith